Robert John Bartlett (1879–1980) was a British psychologist.

Career
Bartlett was born in 1879.  In 1921, he obtained an MSc Psychology as an external student of the University of London through courses taken at King's College and Bedford College. He was also awarded an ARCSc (Associate of the Royal College of Science), an undergraduate award from the former Royal College of Science. He originally trained in chemistry.

From 1919, he was Assistant Director and then, from 1921, Director of the Psychological Department at Bethlem Hospital until the NHS took over.  He was also Lecturer in Normal Psychology to nurses at St. Bartholomew's Hospital, London.

He was elected President of the British Psychological Society in 1947.  He concluded his Presidential Address to the Society with the words: "Psychology is now a vast subject split up into many different sections, each using its own jargon, knowing very little of what is happening in other sections, and, in several cases, claiming that its part is the whole."

Awards
1963 - Honorary Fellow, British Psychological Society

References

1879 births
1980 deaths
Alumni of Bedford College, London
Alumni of King's College London
British psychologists